Neriene katyae is a species of spider of the genus Neriene. It is endemic to Sri Lanka.

See also
 List of Linyphiidae species

References

Linyphiidae
Spiders described in 1969
Spiders of Asia
Arthropods of Sri Lanka
Endemic fauna of Sri Lanka